Russell Taff (born November 11, 1953) is an American gospel singer and songwriter who grew up in Farmersville, California. He has sung a variety of musical styles throughout his career including: pop rock, traditional Southern gospel, contemporary country music, and rhythm and blues. He first gained recognition as lead vocalist for the Imperials (1976–81). One of his best-known performances is the song "Praise the Lord". He has also been a member of the Gaither Vocal Band, and occasionally tours with Bill Gaither in the Gaither Homecoming concerts. As a solo artist and songwriter, Taff is known for the 1980s anthem "We Will Stand". Taff has received various Dove and Grammy awards either as a solo artist or part of a larger musical group, most notably the Imperials.

Early life
Russ Taff was born to Joe and Ann Taff on November 11, 1953, the fourth of five sons, and grew up in Farmersville, California. Taff's father was a pastor of a small Pentecostal church - the Eastside Tabernacle Church which was located in an old laundromat - and machinist while his mother, Ann, was a field worker who picked fruit and chopped cotton.

Taff's younger years were taken up with the church and a tumultuous home life where he suffered physical and verbal abuse from both parents. His father's alcoholism, which Taff shared later in life, and verbal abuse along with his mom's physical abuse became overwhelming and confusing to the young boy. He retreated to his mother's collection of black and southern gospel albums, as any secular music was forbidden by his parents along with newspapers, magazines and TV.

By the time he was 11 years old, Taff had learned to play the guitar which, along with singing, became an outlet for him from the familial strife. He credits his oldest brother, Bill, with being highly influential at this time, taking him to "all-night gospel sings and that sort of thing."  The family moved to Hot Springs, Arkansas when Taff was 15 only to move back to California a few years later with Taff remaining in Arkansas to start college. It was at this time that he began listening to popular music for the first time.

This was also the time, historically speaking, when the Jesus movement was in evidence across the United States. At age 16, Taff started a band with James Hollihan, Jr. (who became a lifelong musical friend and frequent co-producer) which they named Sounds of Joy. This led to an opportunity to play at the high school they attended which opened many opportunities to share their faith with other classmates during this remarkable time in history. Sounds of Joy covered artists like Love Song and Larry Norman. The group ended up recording 3 albums of their own, one of which was produced by Gary Paxton. At one point in the 70s, Sounds of Joy got the opportunity to open for the Imperials who were recognized as one of the trailblazing artists in the field of what became known as Contemporary Christian Music (CCM).

The Imperials
Sometime prior to 1976 Taff toured as a singer with evangelist Jerry Seville. Aside from the opportunity to perform, he was "really studying the Bible" after his many years of being influenced by the emotionalism of his Pentecostal upbringing. In 1976, having made an impression on the group 2 years earlier, The Imperials called with an offer to audition for the position as the group's new lead singer. Two weeks before his 23rd birthday, Taff traveled to Nashville where the try outs were taking place. Taff said "I sang with them that afternoon and that evening they hired me. I joined the Imperials when I was 22, and I’ve been riding buses ever since." His first appearance on an Imperials album was on 1977's Sail On which won the Grammy for Best Gospel Performance, Contemporary Or Inspirational. Taff remained their lead singer from 1976 through 1981 for what is recognized as the Imperials most successful period as a group.

Part of the reason Taff left the group in 1981 was due to the financial arrangements he had with them. He was paid a straight salary for his work within the group which meant he did not share in any of the monies generated by ticket or album sales. Mark Allen Powell, writing in the ECCM, opined that this arrangement was likely fine when he first signed on with the Imperials, but was not an equitable situation when Taff's membership turned the group into the ‘single best-selling contemporary Christian music group’ in the US for the period of time he was a member. During his time with the Imperials the group garnered 3 Grammys and 5 Dove Awards with Taff earning 1 Dove Award himself. It was also during this time, at age 26, that the alcoholism that had been a part of the earlier family dynamic with his father became a part of Taff's own life.

Solo career to current
His time with the Imperials laid the groundwork for Taff's subsequent solo career. He has released 12 solo albums, earning two Grammys and five additional Dove Awards. He became highly regarded for his vocal ability with Billboard at one time calling him "the single most electrifying voice in Christian music". Aside from his own projects, Taff frequently appeared as a guest vocalist on other artist's albums. In fact, he mentioned that at one point his label had explored the idea of releasing an album of the duets he had sung with other artists, but soon realized that the resulting record would have resulted in a double disc worth of material. His 1985 album, Medals, was well received critically moving CCM magazine to predict it would be that years choice for best album. While that prediction did not come to pass, U2's Unforgettable Fire received that honor, it became regarded as a classic amongst contemporary Christian albums. A 2001 poll of critics undertaken by CCM Magazine placed Medals at 36 on the list of the ‘greatest’ 100 Christian albums at that time. It did receive criticisms of sounding a ‘bit too derivative’ of Hall & Oates and its themes being too geared toward "simplistic triumphalism"  as mentioned by Brian Quincy Newcombe and "expressive of a militancy" that was inappropriate for Christian music.

In 1991 Taff was invited by Bill Gaither to join the Gaither Homecoming video series leading to guest appearances in the Homecoming concerts. He also briefly replaced Michael English in the Gaither Vocal Band in 1994. He had been doing a few solo albums during this time when he released the mainstream country album, Winds of Change (1995), on Reprise which was followed by his return to CCM after a decade-long absence from Christian pop with Right Here, Right Now in 1999, two years after the death of his father.  He then joined the Gaither Vocal Band again, singing with them from 2001 to 2004. He still performs at some of the larger Gaither events along with doing solo appearances two weekends a month.

I Still Believe, a documentary film on Taff by director Rick Altizer saw limited release in October 2018. The film explores Taff's life from early childhood to present day touching on the family strife, singing career and dealing with his own issues of alcoholism.

Personal
Taff is married and with his wife Tori, who he married the same year he joined the Imperials, has two adult daughters. Tori is quite involved with her husband's career as she is his main songwriting partner. Taff's history of alcohol abuse, which started when he was 26, did experience a stretch of sobriety from 1988 to 1997 between his father and mother's deaths, but did not last. He finally gained victory over his addiction through Christian counseling and intense trauma therapy.

Discography
Solo albums

Compilations
1994: We Will Stand/Yesterday and Today (Myrrh)
2003: The Best of Russ Taff (Spring Hill)

With the Sounds of Joy
1974: YHWH (Shalom Records)
1975: Sharin (JoySong Records)With the Imperials1977: Sail On (Dayspring/Word)
1978: Imperials Live (Dayspring/Word)
1979: Heed The Call (Dayspring/Word)
1979: One More Song For You (Dayspring/Word)
1980: Priority (Dayspring/Word)
1980: Christmas with the Imperials (Dayspring/Word)
1981: The Very Best of the Imperials (Dayspring/Word) compilation
1986: Old Fashioned Faith (Dayspring/Word) compilation
1996: Legacy 1977–1988 (Word Records) compilation
2006: The Lost Album (Word Records) (originally recorded in 1976)
2006: The Imperials – Classic Hits (New Haven/Provident) compilation
2007: The Definitive Collection (Word/Warner) compilationWith Gaither Vocal Band2002: Everything Good (SpringHouse/EMI)
2003: A Cappella (SpringHouse/EMI)Appearances on other albums'''
 1981: For Every Man Steve Camp "Thank You"
 1981: Love Overflowing Sandi Patty "The Home of the Lord"
 1983: More than a Feelin Koinonia (Sparrow) "Give Your Love", "Divina"
 1984: For People Who Don't Hear The Music Anymore (Word) Joyce Landorf  "I'll keep my eyes you"
 1984: Dancing with Danger Leslie Phillips (Myrrh) "Strength of My Life"
 1984: The Praise in Us – A Word Family Praise Album Various Artists (Myrrh) "Simple Song for a Mighty God"
 1984: Vital Signs – White Heart (Home Sweet Home Records/Myrrh) "We Are His Hands"
 1985: The CAUSE (various artists) (Sparrow) "Do Something Now"
 1985: Lulu Roman Smith "King of Who I Am"
 1985: Sheep in Wolves Clothing Mylon LeFevre and Broken Heart (Myrrh) "Gospel Ship"
 1988: Phil Keaggy & Sunday's Child Phil Keaggy (Myrrh) "Aint Got No"
 1988: Can't Buy a Miracle Randy Stonehill (Word) "Awfully Loud World"
 1988: Lead Me On – Amy Grant (A&M) "All Right"
 1989: Our Hymns (Word) Medley: "Near The Cross"/"My Jesus I Love Thee"/"Turn Your Eyes Upon Jesus"
 1990: Phase II Eddie DeGarmo (Fore Front) "There's Something About That Name"
 1990: Stolen Moments – John Hiatt (A&M)
 1990: Through Flood & Fire – Sparks "Jesus Rescues Me" (Reunion)
 1990: Our Christmas (Word) "Silent Night"
 1990: Handel's Young Messiah (A&M) "He Shall Feed His Flock Like a Shepherd" with Sheila Walsh
 1991: For Such a Time as This Sheila Walsh (Star Song) "A Dove Amongst Eagles"
 1991: Big Town – Ashley Cleveland (Atlantic)
 1991: Show Me Your Way  Glen Campbell (New Haven) "The Greatest Gift of All"
 1992: Above And Beyond O'Landa Draper & The Associates (Word) "Wipe A Tear"
 1992: Innocent Eyes Tanya Goodman Sykes (Benson) "Who at My Door is Standing?"
 1992: No Compromise: Remembering the Music of Keith Green (Sparrow) "Your Love Broke Through"
 1992: Did You Think to Pray This Morning? – The Johnson Sisters with Russ Taff (Canaan)
 1993: Lead Me Not – Lari White (RCA)
 1993: Sweet Relief: A Benefit for Victoria Williams – various artists (Thirsty Ear/Chaos)
 1995: Beyond December – First Call (Warner Alliance)
 1996: Way I Should – Iris DeMent (Warner Bros.)
 1997: Fire Down Below original soundtrack (Warner Brothers) "I'd Walk Through Fire"
 1997: Misguided Roses – Edwin McCain Band (Atlantic)
 1998: Alabama Song – Allison Moorer (MCA)
 1998: The Apostle original soundtrack (Rising Tide) "There Ain't No Grave Gonna Hold My Body Down"
 1998: Joy – Melissa Manchester (Capitol)
 1998: Mission 3:16 – Carman (Sparrow) "People of God"
 1998: Totally Committed – Jeff Foxworthy (Warner Bros.)
 1998: Jesus Saves Greg Long(Myrrh) "Prove That By Me"
 1999: Vestal & Friends Vestal Goodman "Giver of Life"
 1999: Bridges original soundtrack (Verity) "Raven and the Dove"
 2000: Child of the Promise original cast recording (Sparrow) "The Mary I Know", "Mary Recitative", "Zacharias Recitative", "Nothing Ever Happens to a Shepherd"
 2000: Hands of Time Anthony Burger (Daywind) "I Wish We'd All Been Ready"
 2000: Ordinary Day Jeff and Sheri Easter (Spring Hill) "One Way"
 2001: Supernatural – The Raphaels (Track Records)
 2001: Press On Selah (Curb) "Were You There"
 2002: Traveling Light: Songs from the 23rd Psalm (Brentwood) "Let It Flow"
 2002: Edge of the World Randy Stonehill (Fair Oaks) "We Were So Young"
 2004: Better Days Frank Bradford (Frb Records) "Watergrave"
 2005: Hymned No. 1 Bart Millard (of MercyMe) (INO/Epic) "Precious Lord, Take My Hand"
 2006: Stand Avalon (Sparrow/EMI) "We Will Stand"
 2008: Fall Like Rain Clint Brown (Tribe Records) "I'm Forgiven"
 2016: Circuit Rider – William Lee Golden (Gaither Gospel Series)

Solo singles

VideoLong-form 1982: More Than Music No. 1 (Word) (originally aired as a TV show in 1981) "I Go to the Rock", "Here We Are" (duet with Amy Grant)
 1992: Russ Taff: A Christmas Song (Sparrow)
 2002: I Do Believe Gaither Vocal Band "One Way"
 2006: Ernie Haase & Signature Sound "Hold To God's Unchanging Hand"
 2007: The Best of Russ Taff From the Gaither Homecoming Series
 2007: Timeless: Concert of Faith & Inspiration
 2009: Gaither Vocal Band Reunion: Vol. 1 "Born Again", "Heartbreak Ridge And New Hope Road", "Knowing You'll Be There"
 2009: Gaither Vocal Band Reunion: Vol. 2 "The Really Big News", "When The Rains Come"

Concept Music videosGaither Homecoming video performances1998: Down by the Tabernacle "The Tabernacle", "I Saw the Light"
1998: Rivers of Joy "We Will Stand"
1999: I'll Meet You on the Mountain "Hold To God's Unchanging Hand"
2000: Good News "When He Set Me Free"
2000: Irish Homecoming "Ain't No Grave"
2000: Whispering Hope "O Say, But I'm Glad"
2001: A Billy Graham Music Homecoming, Vol.2 "My Tribute"
2001: London Homecoming "We Will Stand"
2002: Let Freedom Ring "When He Calls I'll Fly Away"
2002: New Orleans Homecoming "Praise The Lord"
2003: Australian Homecoming
2003: Red Rocks Homecoming "They Call It Gospel Music"
2003: Rocky Mountain Homecoming "The Workshop of the Lord"
2004: Journey to the Sky "Trumpet Of Jesus"
2004: Passin' the Faith Along "Born Again"
2004: We Will Stand "We Will Stand"
2005: Jerusalem Homecoming "Bethlehem, Galilee, Gethsemane"
2006: Canadian Homecoming "More Than Ever"
2006: Live from Toronto "Trumpet Of Jesus"
2006: Christmas in South Africa "Higher Than Mt. Kilimanjaro"
2007: Amazing Grace "Amazing Grace"
2008: Homecoming Picnic "The Sweetest Song I Know"
2009: Joy in My Heart "Jesus Is The Best Thing"
2011: Alaskan Homecoming "Somebody's Coming", "We Will Stand"
2011: Majesty "I Shall Wear A Crown"

Awards and honors

GrammysWith the Imperials1977 Best Gospel Performance, Contemporary or Inspirational for Sail On
1979 Best Gospel Performance, Contemporary or Inspirational for Heed the Call
1981 Best Gospel Performance, Contemporary or Inspirational for  PrioritySolo1983 Best Gospel Performance, Male for Walls of Glass
1991 Best Rock/Contemporary Gospel Album for Under Their Influence

GMA DovesAs member of the Imperials1977: Male Group of the Year
1979: Male Group of the Year
1980: Male Group of the Year
1981: Male Group of the Year
1981: Song of the Year – "Praise The Lord"
1981: Male Vocalist of the Year
1982: Male Vocalist of the Year
1998: Inducted into the GMA's Gospel Music Hall of Fame (with all five original members: Jake Hess, Armond Morales, Gary McSpadden, Sherrill Neilsen & Henry Slaughter, as well as Joe Moscheo, Terry Blackwood, Sherman Andrus, and Jim Murray)Solo1984: Male Vocalist of the Year
1986: Pop/Contemporary Album of the Year for Medals
1989: Rock Album of the Year for Russ Taff
1989: Recorded Music Packaging of the Year for Russ Taff
1990: Rock Album of the Year for The Way Home
1990: Rock Recorded Song of the Year for "The River Unbroken"
2016: Inducted into the GMA's Gospel Music Hall of FameNominations with the Gaither Vocal Band'''
2003: Southern Gospel Recorded Song of the Year
2003: Country Album of the Year

See also
 Dove Award for Song of the Year
 Grammy Award for Best Gospel Performance, Contemporary

References

Sources
 Encyclopedia of Contemporary Christian Music; Powell; pp 46, 47; Hendrickson Publishers; Pap/Cdr edition (August 2002)  
 Alfonso, Barry (2002) s The Billboard Guide to Contemporary Christian Music
 Jones, Kim (2008) About.com
 Larkin, Colin (2006) The Encyclopedia of Popular Music
 Mansfield, Brian (2005) [ Allmusic.com]
 TPE Interview (2006). Today's Pentecostal Evangel

External links

The Imperials official website
Gaither Homecoming website

1953 births
American performers of Christian music
Grammy Award winners
Living people
Myrrh Records artists
People from Farmersville, California
Southern gospel performers